is a passenger railway station located in the city of Gyōda, Saitama, Japan, operated by the private railway operator Chichibu Railway.

Lines

Station layout
The station consists of a single island platform serving two tracks.

Platforms

Adjacent stations

History
Mochida Station opened on 15 November 1924.

Passenger statistics
In fiscal 2018, the station was used by an average of 938 passengers daily.

Surrounding area

See also
 List of railway stations in Japan

References

External links

  

Stations of Chichibu Railway
Railway stations in Japan opened in 1924
Railway stations in Saitama Prefecture
Gyōda